Dicheros bicornis is a species of beetles belonging to the family Scarabaeidae, subfamily Cetoniinae.

Subspecies
 Dicheros bicornis yaekoae
 Dicheros bicornis siamensis
 Dicheros bicornis rowelli
 Dicheros bicornis lombokensis
 Dicheros bicornis borneensis
 Dicheros bicornis ornatus Hope, 1841
 Dicheros bicornis biplagiatus
 Dicheros bicornis decorus Gory & Percheron, 1833
 Dicheros bicornis burmeisteri
 Dicheros bicornis florensis Wallace, 1867
 Dicheros bicornis kurosawai Nagai, 1998
 Dicheros bicornis malayanus Wallace, 1867
 Dicheros bicornis nagaiisakaiique
 Dicheros bicornis westwoodi

Description
Coloration and pattern of these beetles are variable, depending on subspecies. Pronotum may be dark brown or reddish, while elytra are usually yellowish or white, with brown markings on the apex or margins. This species shows a sexual dimorphism, as males are larger than females and have two horns (hence the Latin name bicornis) on clypeus.

Distribution
This species can be found in Philippines, Malaysia and Indonesia.

Gallery

References
 Latreille P.A. (1817) Les crustaces, les arachnides et les insectes. Cuvier G.: Le Règne Animal Distribué d'après son Organisation pour Servir de base à l'Histoire Naturelle des Animaux, Déterville Paris 3:1-653
 Scarabs: World Scarabaeidae Database. Schoolmeesters P.

External links
 Animal Life Forms
 Flower Beetles
 Salagubang
 Global Species
 Transactions of the Royal Entomological Society of London
 Universal Biological Indexer

Cetoniinae
Beetles described in 1817